The Miracle at Cardenrigg is a novel by the Scottish writer Tom Hanlin published in 1949 by Victor Gollancz in the UK and Random House in the US.

Plot

Two hundred miners are trapped underground.  The story of their survival involves both adventure and suspense.

References

See also

Scottish novels
1949 British novels
Victor Gollancz Ltd books